The Service Desk Institute (SDI), founded in 1988, is a worldwide professional organisation for those working in the IT service and support industry. SDI delivers information to help improve the knowledge of help desk professionals through IT support training, community based forums and event-based services. Their stated goals are to help individuals improve their knowledge and skills to enhance the careers of IT service professionals.

Background 
SDI was first named The Help Desk User Group and was founded by Howard Kendall. The company later became known as the Help Desk Institute. In 2008 the company undertook a re-branding exercise and on 9 April 2008 changed its name to The Service Desk Institute.

See also 
 Service Desk (ITSM)
 Help desk
 ITIL

References 

 SDI's Standards for Service Desks and for IT Service professionals
 SDI's Free Online Service Desk Assessment
 Service Desk Certification, A Pocket Guide
 IT Service Buyer's Guide
 IT Service & Support Awards
 The SDI Service Desk Benchmarking Trends Report
 Future IT Service Trends: The Service Desk in 2017 & Beyond
 SDI Events Calendar: Inspiring one-day events for IT service professionals who want to improve their service desk
 Service Desk Analyst Qualification
 Service Desk Manager Qualification

External links 

 

Technology trade associations